Connected Data Objects (CDO) is a free implementation of a Distributed Shared Model on top of the Eclipse Modeling Framework (EMF).

With CDO, programmers can easily enhance existing EMF models in such a way that they can be stored and subsequently maintained in a central model repository. While object relational mapping against a JDBC data source on the server side is the shipped default, CDO provides for pluggable storage adapters that allow you to develop and use different mappers (like  Hibernate- or OODB-based). On the client side, CDO provides a default integration with EMF, the Eclipse Modeling Framework, although other model integrations on top of the CDO protocol are imaginable as well.

Model integration features
 EMF integration at model level (as opposed to the edit level)
 Support for generated models (just switch two .genmodel properties)
 Support for dynamic models (just load .ecore file and commit to repository)
 Support for legacy models (for compiled models without access to .genmodel)
 Support for the Ecore meta model and descendants

User interface features
 Eclipse view for working with CDO sessions, transactions, views and resources
 Package Manager dialog per session
 Eclipse editor for working with resources and objects

Client side features
 Multiple sessions to multiple repositories on multiple servers
 Multiple transactions per session
 Multiple read-only views per session
 Multiple audit views per session (an audit is a view that shows a consistent, historical version of a repository)
 Multiple resources per view (a view is always associated with its own EMF ResourceSet)
 Inter-resource proxy resolution
 Multiple root objects per resource
 Object state shared among all views of a session
 Object graph internally unconnected (unused parts of the graph can easily be reclaimed by the garbage collector)
 Only new and modified objects committed in a transaction
 Transactions can span multiple resources
 Demand loading of objects (resources are populated as they are navigated)
 Partial loading of collections (chunk size can be configured per session)
 Adaptable pre-fetching of objects (different intelligent usage analyzers are available)
 Asynchronous object invalidation (optional)
 Clean API to work with sessions, views, transactions and objects
 CDOResources are EObjects as well
 Objects carry meta information like id, state, version and life span
 Support for OSGi environments (headless, Eclipse RCP, ...)
 Support for standalone applications (non-OSGi)

Network protocol features
 Net4j based binary application protocol
 Pluggable transport layer (shipped with NIO socket transport and JVM embedded transport)
 Pluggable fail over support
 Pluggable authentication (shipped with challenge/response negotiation)
 Multiple acceptors per server

Server side features
 Pluggable storage adapters
 Multiple repositories per server
 Multiple models (packages) per repository
 Multiple resources (instance documents) per repository
 Expressive XML configuration file
 Configurable storage adapter per repository (see below)
 Configurable caching per repository
 Clean API to work with repositories, sessions, views, transactions and revisions
 Support for OSGi environments (usually headless)
 Support for standalone applications (non-OSGi)

DB store features
 Supports all optional features of the CDO Server
 Pluggable SQL dialect adapters
 Includes support for Derby, HSQLDB, MySQL and Oracle (TBD)
 Pluggable mapping strategies
 Includes horizontal mapping strategy (one table per concrete class)
 Includes vertical mapping strategy (TBD, one table per class in hierarchy)
 Supports different mapping modes for collections

External links
CDO Homepage

Eclipse (software)